Cyperus kipasensis is a species of sedge that is native to Africa, having been found growing in Angola, Chad, Zambia, Tanzania and the Democratic Republic of the Congo.

The species was first formally described by the botanist Henri Chermezon in 1934.

See also
 List of Cyperus species

References

kipasensis
Taxa named by Henri Chermezon
Plants described in 1934
Flora of the Democratic Republic of the Congo
Flora of Angola
Flora of Chad
Flora of Zambia
Flora of Tanzania